Bais is a traditional Filipino mead from the Mandaya and Dibabawon Manobo of northeastern Mindanao. It is made from a mixture of honey and water at varying proportions. It is fermented for at least five days to a month or more.

See also
Byais
Kabarawan
Intus
Mead
Sima

References

Fermented drinks
Philippine alcoholic drinks
Philippine cuisine